The Tall Cedars of Lebanon International is a side degree of Freemasonry in certain Grand Jurisdictions, open to Master Masons in good standing in a regular Masonic Lodge. Its motto, "Fun, Frolic, & Fellowship," is indicative of this social bent. Its members are distinguished by the pyramid-shaped hats they wear at their functions. The name is derived from the cedars of Lebanon that King Solomon used to build his Temple.

History 
The origin of the degree originated before the establishment of the formal organization. Some historians trace it as far back as the 1840s. The awarding of the degree apparently involved a deal of roughhousing. This degree was conferred on Master Masons after their Blue Lodge meeting closed. This degree was conferred by traveling Masons throughout the East Coast and the Mid-west. This original group of Tall Cedars, called their organization the "Ancient Order of Tall Cedars of Lebanon". "Forests" or local clubs were formed with Victory Forest #1 located in Chicago, Illinois. The Ancient Order of Tall Cedars continued until 1901.  The Tall Cedars of Lebanon of the U.S.A. was founded in 1902 in Trenton, New Jersey. The organization adopted its present official name in 1972.

Organization
Cedars meet in groups called "Forests," each headed by a Grand Tall Cedar. These forests most often meet at the local Masonic hall. The Tall Cedars claim 15,000 members, mostly in the eastern United States. Its center of activity was, and is the states of New Jersey and Pennsylvania; the Tall Cedars' national governing body, The Supreme Forest, is headquartered in Harrisburg, Pennsylvania.  The current Supreme Tall Cedar — the TCL's highest-ranking officer — is Joseph Russell, of Liberty, Missouri. 

There are two further side degrees with the group - the Royal Court and the Sidonian. There is also a marching band called the Royal Rangers.

Charitable activities 
The Tall Cedar Foundation exists as the body's charitable arm, supporting research into muscular dystrophy and other neuromuscular diseases.  In 1951, it became the first organization to join permanently with the Muscular Dystrophy Association in sponsorship. Tall Cedars often provide the site and volunteers for local telephone banks for the annual Jerry Lewis Telethon.

References

External links 
 Tall Cedars International

Masonic organizations
Organizations based in Harrisburg, Pennsylvania
Organizations established in 1902